Antisemitism in Soviet mathematics was a manifestation of hostility, prejudice and discrimination in the Soviet Union towards Jews in the scientific and educational environment related to mathematics.

According to numerous testimonies and facts, from the second half of the 1960s to the beginning of the 1980s, Jews studying or working in the field of mathematics in the USSR were discriminated against when entering universities, postgraduate studies and work, when defending their dissertations, when trying to publish an article or book, when traveling to scientific conferences and abroad.

Academicians Ivan Vinogradov, Lev Pontryagin and a number of others, who for a long time led and determined policy in Soviet mathematics, were accused of carrying out antisemitic policies. This has caused several international scandals. Pontryagin himself denied these accusations.

Discrimination became one of the reasons for the mass emigration of Jewish mathematicians from the USSR. Due to possible emigration, Jews in the USSR were often viewed as disloyal citizens, although discrimination preceded emigration, and not vice versa.

Background 
Antisemitism in the USSR was a continuation of antisemitism in the Russian Empire. Since 1887 in the Russian Empire there was a Jewish quota for students ranging from 3% in Moscow and Saint Petersburg and up to 10% in the Pale of Settlement region. Some educational institutions were generally closed for Jews. Jews were allowed to lecture at universities as a rare exception; it was almost impossible for a Jew to make a scientific career in Russia.

At the state level, antisemitism emerged in the USSR in the late 1930s and peaked in the late 1940s and early 1950s. During this period, two major openly anti-Jewish trials took place — the case of the Night of the Murdered Poets and the "doctors' plot". In 1944, restrictions were imposed on the admission of Jews to universities. During the anti-cosmopolitan campaign, Jewish students were expelled from universities, and scientists and teachers were fired from their jobs.

Since 1967, after the Arab-Israeli Six-Day War, anti-Zionist propaganda has sharply intensified in the USSR, often turning into prejudice towards Jews. On 9 March 1968,  against the illegal forced sending of dissident Alexander Esenin-Volpin to a psychiatric hospital. After that, many who signed the letter were subjected to repression: they were required to refuse to sign the letter, they were kicked out of their jobs, demoted, prohibited from traveling abroad, etc. Gradually, the leadership of Soviet mathematics was changed, and a new antisemitic policy began to be pursued.

Discrimination against Jewish mathematicians in the USSR

Discrimination in education 
Historian Semyon Charny, an employee of the Memorial human rights research centre, notes that discrimination was originally inherent in the Soviet education system, but was based on class. A discriminatory system based on ethnicity in order to prevent Jews from entering certain universities emerged in the late 1940s. It was fully formed and operated since the 1960s. The Shorter Jewish Encyclopedia reports that during this period “many faculties of Moscow, Leningrad, Kiev and other universities, the Moscow Engineering Physics Institute, the Moscow Physics and Technology Institute were completely or partially closed to Jews. Many academic institutions stopped hiring Jews.” Lyudmila Alexeyeva, a human rights activist and member of the Moscow Helsinki Group, noted that "constraint in access to education is the most sensitive of the discriminatory measures against Jews, since the desire to educate children is one of the best preserved traditions in Jewish families."

One of the most scandalous areas of this discrimination was the massive denial of admission to the MSU Faculty of Mechanics and Mathematics for applicants of Jewish origin. Israeli-Swiss author and journalist George Szpiro calls the current rector of Moscow State University Viktor Sadovnichiy (at that time he supervised the work of admissions committees), the dean of the MSU Faculty of Mechanics and Mathematics Oleg Lupanov, as well as professor and senior examiner Alexander Mishchenko as the main conductors of the discriminatory policy at the MSU Faculty of Mechanics and Mathematics. Russian-French mathematician  adds to this list a number of members of the selection committee. Leading researcher of the Faculty of Mechanics and Mathematics Vladimir Tkachuk wrote about the mass discrimination of Jews in the textbook "Mathematics for an applicant". A similar system operated at the Bauman Moscow State Technical University and some other prestigious universities.

George Szpiro wrote:

There were significantly fewer Jews admitted to the Faculty of Mechanics and Mathematics of Moscow State University in 1978 than under the conditions of the Jewish quota of the Russian Empire. That year, 21 graduates of one of the Moscow mathematical schools entered the faculty, including 14 Russians and 7 Jews. All 14 Russians were accepted, out of 7 Jews — only 1 (he received the 1st prize at the International Mathematical Olympiad and for 3 years in a row received the 1st prize at the All-Union Olympiads).

Mathematician and dissident Valery Senderov spoke about the methods by which the administration of the Mechanics and Mathematics Department did not allow Jewish applicants to enter the university. So, the most talented of Jewish students, who were difficult to weed out in other ways, were asked to solve the most complex  as tasks for entrance exams, which was directly prohibited by the instructions of the USSR Ministry of Higher Education. Special tasks were also designed, which had a formal solution within the framework of the school curriculum, but it was impossible to solve them in a reasonable time. In the oral examinations, questions were asked that went far beyond the scope of the school curriculum. Sometimes during oral examinations Jewish applicants were gathered into separate groups, and the auditoriums where they took the exams were called "gas chambers". According to Mikhail Shifman, professor at the Institute of Theoretical Physics at the University of Minnesota, “only those Jewish applicants who, for special reasons, were not included in these groups, for example, the children of professors, academicians or other "necessary" people, could enroll" in the Faculty of Mechanics and Mathematics at Moscow State University.

Academician Igor Shafarevich, speaking about the representation of different nationalities in prestigious areas, wrote about these exams:

Academician Andrei Sakharov also commented on this discrimination. He wrote that similar methods were used not only against Jewish applicants, but also against the children of dissidents.

The problems themselves, offered to Jewish applicants for entrance exams at the Faculty of Mechanics and Mathematics of Moscow State University, gained fame and became the subject of discussion in the international scientific community.

References 

Antisemitism in the Soviet Union
Science and technology in the Soviet Union